Four ships of the French Navy have borne the name Ville de Paris, in honour of the city of Paris:

 The 90-gun ship of the line , later upgraded to 104 guns
 , a 12-gun vessel
 Ville de Paris (1804), a 110-gun ship of the line, lead ship of her class, renamed Commerce de Paris
 , a 120-gun ship of the line of the 

 Also the ship of the line of the Royal Navy , launched in 1795, was named in honour of the 1764 vessel  

Ville de Paris